A house stock is a stock that the management of a brokerage firm or boiler room has instructed all its brokers to promote.  The brokerage firm or its owners might be receiving an undisclosed profit from the sale of the house stock.

Stock market